The 2000 Marlboro Grand Prix of Miami presented by Toyota was the first round of the 2000 CART FedEx Championship Series, held March 26, 2000, on the Homestead–Miami Speedway in Homestead, Florida.

The race winner was Max Papis, his first Champ Car victory. This was the final CART-sanctioned event at Homestead.  The event would go to the rival Indy Racing League for 2001 through 2010.

Final Results
Max Papis
Roberto Moreno
Paul Tracy
Jimmy Vasser
Patrick Carpentier
Gil de Ferran
Christian Fittipaldi
Shinji Nakano
Alex Tagliani
Tony Kanaan +1 lap
Dario Franchitti +1 lap
Cristiano da Matta + 1 lap
Mark Blundell +2 laps
Michel Jourdain Jr. +3 laps
Norberto Fontana +3 laps
Maurício Gugelmin +4 laps
Luiz Garcia Jr Crash
Kenny Brack Oil Leak
Oriol Servià  transmission
Gualter Salles transmission
Adrián Fernández Oil Leak
Michael Andretti Oil Pressure
Juan Pablo Montoya Engine
Takuya Kurosawa Electrical
Hélio Castroneves Electrical

External links
Race results at ChampCarStats.com

Homestead–Miami Indy 300
Marlboro Grand Prix
Marlboro Grand Prix